Lin Dan (born 14 October 1983) is a Chinese former professional badminton player. He is a two-time Olympic champion, five-time World champion, as well as a six-time All England champion. Widely regarded as the greatest badminton player of all time, by the age of 28 Lin had completed the "Super Grand Slam", having won what some consider to be the nine major titles in the badminton world: Olympic Games, World Championships, World Cup, Thomas Cup, Sudirman Cup, Super Series Masters Finals, All England Open, Asian Games, and Asian Championships, becoming the first and only player to achieve this feat. He also became the first men's singles player to retain the Olympic gold medal by winning in 2008 and successfully defending his title in 2012. 

In 2004, he was dubbed "Super Dan" by opponent Peter Gade after winning the All England Open final, and the nickname has since been widely used by his fans as well as the media to refer to him, in recognition of his achievements.

Early life
Lin was born in Fujian, China. At a young age, Lin was encouraged to learn to play the piano by his parents, and to be a pianist. However, he chose to play badminton instead. Having started his training at the age of five, he was scouted by the People's Liberation Army Sports Team after winning the National Junior Championships aged twelve, and was enlisted into the Chinese National Badminton Team in 2001, when he was 18.

Badminton career

Junior events
Lin emerged as a winner in the 2000 Badminton Asia Junior Championships in both the team and the singles events. He was also a member of the winning Chinese team and a boys' singles semi-finalist in the 2000 World Junior Championships.

2001–2003
2001 marked the start of then 18 year-old Lin's professional career. In his first final, at the Asian Badminton Championships, he was thrashed by compatriot Xia Xuanze.

In 2002 Lin took his first title at the Korea Open. He was a member of China's 2002 Thomas Cup squad which defeated Sweden (5–0), Denmark (3–2), and South Korea (4–1) to reach the semifinals. However, Lin didn't play in the semifinal tie against Malaysia, which saw China's team tumble to a 1–3 defeat. Lin participated in another four tournaments without coming close to victory. He was knocked out in the first round of the Singapore, and Indonesia Opens, second round of the Denmark Open, and third round of the China Open. In October Lin was defeated in the semifinals of the Asian Games team competition which ended China's hope of a team gold medal.

Lin started the 2003 season with a third round defeat in the All England Open. He reached a final later in the year at the Japan Open but was beaten by his compatriot Xia Xuanze once again. Lin then made his inaugural debut in the World Championships in Birmingham, England. He breezed past Per-Henrik Croona and Przemysław Wacha in the first two rounds, but was beaten by Xia again in his third round match. After the world meet, he was eliminated in the semifinals of the Singapore Open, third round of the Indonesia Open, and second round of the Malaysia Open. However, Lin ended the season strongly by capturing the Denmark, Hong Kong, and China Opens, and finishing runner-up at the German Open.

2004
Lin had a good start to 2004, earning the BWF's number one world ranking for the first time in February. He helped China win the qualifying round of Thomas Cup and then captured the Swiss Open. He won his first ever All England Open title by beating Peter Gade in the final. He reached the semifinal of the Japan Open before going off to Jakarta, Indonesia in May for the Thomas Cup campaign.

In Thomas Cup, Lin helped China to an excellent start in which they thrashed United States and defending champion Indonesia 5–0 respectively to enter the quarterfinals. Lin then defeated Shoji Sato and Lee Hyun-il in quarterfinal and semifinal ties against Japan and South Korea respectively, each ending in 3–0 wins for China. In the final, he beat Peter Gade in straight games to give China the lead before the Chinese team eventually won three matches to one. China thus took the crown, ending a 14 years drought in the tournament.

Lin suffered setbacks later in the 2004 season when he was ousted in the quarterfinals of the Malaysia Open, and was reported to have a leg injury in mid-July, prior to the Olympic Games. Lin "crashed" in his first Olympic Games when, as the first seed, he was ousted early by Singapore's Ronald Susilo, who claimed Lin was "too eager to win". However, Lin bounced back with three titles at the Denmark, German, and China Opens, and ended the season as a semi-finalist at the Indonesia Open.

2005
Lin retained his number one world ranking during 2005, winning his second German and Hong Kong Open titles, as well as the Japan Open, China Masters, and World Cup tournaments. He also helped China recapture the Sudirman Cup (combined men's and women's team championship) when it shut-out both defending champion South Korea in the semifinals and Indonesia in the final.

Lin failed to retain his All England title, losing a three set final to teammate Chen Hong, and he was beaten in the final of the Malaysia Open by another rising star, Lee Chong Wei. In his bid to capture his first BWF World title at Anaheim California, he beat Kennevic Asuncion, Shoji Sato, Lee Hyun-il, and Peter Gade in succession to reach the final. There he was decisively beaten by a peak-form Taufik Hidayat. Lin was also eliminated in the semifinals of the Singapore Open and the quarterfinals of the China Open.

2006
Lin started the season by reaching the semifinals of the German Open, and had a same result in China Masters and China Open. He failed to win the Malaysia Open in June, which saw his opponent Lee Chong Wei produce a superb display to save the title after being 13–20 down in the deciding game, and also lost to Taufik Hidayat in Asian Games final.

However, he won six individual titles in the season. He recaptured the All England Open, and won the Chinese Taipei, Macau, Hong Kong, and Japan Opens. Most significantly, in Madrid, Spain that September he won his first world title after beating his compatriot Bao Chunlai in the final.

In May, Lin and his teammates had extended China's Thomas Cup reign by shutting out Denmark 3–0 for a second consecutive title.

2007
Lin Dan entered 2007 with a loss to South Korea's Park Sung-hwan in the round of 16 at the Malaysia Open. A week later he captured the Korea Open by defeating Chinese teammate Chen Jin in the final. He went on to win the German Open and then the All England championships again, crushing compatriot Chen Yu 21–13, 21–12. In June, Lin Dan was part of the Chinese Sudirman Cup team that retained the cup after beating Indonesia 3–0 in the final at Glasgow, Scotland. Later in the season Lin Dan defeated Wong Choong Hann of Malaysia and became the China Masters champion for 2007. In August, Lin Dan extended his reign as the world champion when he beat Indonesia's Sony Dwi Kuncoro 21–11, 22–20 in the final of the tournament held in Kuala Lumpur, Malaysia. Lin Dan thus became the first man since Yang Yang to win back to back world championships.

2008
Lin started the season with a defeat in the final of the Korea Open to Lee Hyun-il. It was a match filled with controversy as Lin had a scuffle with South Korea's coach Li Mao after a line call dispute. Lin refused to apologize and received no punishment from Badminton World Federation (BWF) after its probe of the altercation. In March he suffered another defeat to his compatriot Chen Jin in the final of the All England Open, which was followed by press accusations that Lin "gave" the match to Chen in order to increase Chen's ranking points for Olympic qualification (which placed stringent limits on the number of participants from any one country). In the following week, Lin won his first Swiss Open. At the Asia Championships, Lin was again accused of helping his compatriot when his loss to Chen Jin in the semifinals ensured Chen's qualification for the Olympic Games.

On 10 April 2008, Lin was involved in yet another controversy when he struck coach Ji Xinpeng in front of his teammates and the media during an intra-squad tournament prior to the Thomas Cup. The incident was allegedly triggered by his unhappiness  with Ji's arrangement of the starting line-up for the tournament. Despite the episode, in May Lin proceeded to win each match he played in the Thomas Cup until China's semifinal clash with Malaysia when he lost rather tamely to Lee Chong Wei. However, China still managed to reach the final by edging Malaysia 3-2, then retained the cup against South Korea with Lin's win at first singles helping China to a 3-1 victory.

Lin won the Thailand Open, his last tournament before the 2008 Olympic Games.

In the Beijing Olympic Games, he beat Hong Kong's Ng Wei in the first round, Park Sung-hwan in the second round, and Peter Gade in the quarterfinals. He then beat his teammate Chen Jin in straight sets to set up a "dream" final against Lee Chong Wei. However, the final was a one-sided match as Lin demolished Lee 21–12, 21–8, and became the first men's singles player to win the Olympic gold as a first seed.

Not back in action until the China Open in November, Lin again beat Lee in the final, before losing to Chen Jin once again in the Hong Kong Open. Lin was eligible to participate in the lucrative Masters Finals in December, but due to the withdrawal of the whole Chinese contingent (citing weariness and injuries), he didn't take part in the tournament.

2009
In March, at his first tournament appearance of 2009, Lin won his fourth All England title without dropping a game, defeating Lee Chong Wei in the final. After this dominant performance, he lost to Lee in the final of Swiss Open a week later.

In May, Lin participated in the Sudirman Cup helping China to consecutive 5–0 victories over England, Japan, and Indonesia. In the semifinals against Malaysia Lin defeated Lee Chong Wei in straight games as China advanced to the final against South Korea with another shutout. In the last round the same form held true as Lin beat Park Sung-hwan thus helping China to secure the Cup for the third time in a row, and each time without dropping a match in the series.

During the rest of 2009 Lin dropped only two matches; in June in the quarterfinals of the Indonesia Open, and, perhaps most surprisingly, in the finals of December's East Asian Games in Hong Kong to South Korea's little known Choi Ho-jin. Aside from those upsets, Lin dominated. In August in Hyderabad he became the first player to win the World Championships three times by beating compatriot Chen Jin in the final. Later Dan would go on to win his fourth China Masters title and first French Open title. He ended his tournament winning streak in November with the China Open title before the late-year upset loss in Hong Kong.

2010

After starting the season disappointingly with quarterfinal losses at both the All England and Swiss Opens, Lin won his first title of the year at the Badminton Asia Championships in New Delhi, which also marked his first victory at this annual event.

Taking part in his fifth Thomas Cup campaign for China in May, Lin won a pair of hard fought encounters with South Korea's Park Sung-hwan in the group ties and the quarterfinals respectively. In the semifinals, he handily defeated Lee Chong Wei in contributing to China's 3-0 victory over Malaysia and a berth in the final against long time rival Indonesia. Here, Lin led off with a comfortable victory over familiar opponent Taufik Hidayat, as China went on to capture its eighth Men's World Team title; its fourth consecutively.

After the Thomas Cup triumph, Lin played in the World Championships in Paris, France. He won his opening match and then beat Henri Hurskainen and Bao Chunlai in the second and third rounds respectively before being upset by Park Sung-hwan in the quarterfinals. That day also saw his archrival Lee Chong Wei exit from the tournament which was eventually won by Lin's compatriot Chen Jin. Lin then bounced back to win the China Masters, but 
lost the final of the Japan Open to Lee Chong Wei the following week, and conceded walkovers in the quarterfinals of both the China Open, and Hong Kong Open late in the year.

However, Lin managed to win his first ever Asian Games gold medal in November by beating Lee Chong Wei in final, thus, at 27, becoming the first player to win all of the present major titles available to Asian men in badminton, both individual and national team. Lin was voted the most valuable player (MVP) at the games' closing ceremony.

2011

Lin began the year with a withdrawal in the Malaysia Open's quarterfinals, which marked his third consecutive withdrawal since late 2010. This action brought some criticism, particularly by well known fellow competitor Taufik Hidayat. The very next week Lin sprang back to win the first ever million dollar badminton tournament, Korea Open by beating Lee Chong Wei in the final. He next won the German Open, beating his compatriot and reigning world champion Chen Jin in the final.

At the prestigious All England Championships in March his hopes for a fifth title were put on hold when he was defeated by Lee Chong Wei in the final. However, in April he won his second Asian Championships on a day which saw China sweep all five titles and in May he helped China to a fourth consecutive Sudirman Cup title by defeating Denmark 3–0 in the final. In June, Lin's withdrawal from the Singapore Open final due to gastric flu drew jeers from fans in the stadium. Just few days later, he was upset by Sho Sasaki in the second round of Indonesia Open.

Healthy again in August, Lin won his fourth World Championship title by beating familiar rivals Peter Gade in the semifinal and Lee Chong Wei in a very tight three game final at Wembley Arena, a venue which would host the badminton competition for 2012 Summer Olympics.

The rather up and down season for Lin continued with the China Masters in September where he was ousted in the semi-finals, and at the Japan Open where he withdrew from the semifinals. This was followed up by a shock exit in the second round of the Denmark Open to Hong Kong player Wong Wing Ki, and another withdrawal during the semifinals of French Open despite leading in the match. He told officials that he was suffering from paronychia (an infection below the fingernail). This was his sixth retirement of the season and many in the media imputed that this was part of a strategy to improve the rankings of other Chinese singles players to allow the maximum number to qualify for the 2012 Olympics. Both Lin and Chinese coach Li Yongbo denied this, citing, instead, the heavy tournament schedule that BWF required of top players, and Lin's need to be ready for the biggest events such as the Olympics. In any case, Lin's slump did not last long. He ended the year by winning three straight events, His fifth Hong Kong Open, the China Open, and his first Super Series Masters Finals title.

2012

Lin started the year by losing to Lee Chong Wei in the final of the Korea Open, and then losing in the second round of the Malaysia Open to Denmark's Jan O. Jorgensen. In early March he took his first title of the season by winning his fifth German Open. The very next week he won his fifth All England Open title as rival Lee Chong Wei was forced to retire in discomfort early in the second game of the final. In April, Lin was again the subject of some controversy when he withdrew from the semifinals of the Badminton Asia Championships, a move that was openly seen as a ploy to secure an Olympic berth for his compatriot Chen Jin.

In Wuhan, China in May, Lin Dan and his teammates won all of their individual matches in each tie they played to win their fifth consecutive Thomas Cup (remarkably China's women also went entirely undefeated to regain the Uber Cup from South Korea). With only a week between Thomas Cup and the Thailand Open in early June, a fatigued Lin lost in the semifinals to Indonesia's highly capable Sony Dwi Kuncoro.

At the 2012 Summer Olympics in London, Lin routinely beat Ireland's Scott Evans to qualify for the main draw of sixteen players where he started by trouncing fading star Taufik Hidayat. In the quarterfinals, however, Japan's hard-fighting Sho Sasaki put Lin to the test before yielding 16-21 in the third game. Lin then handily beat South Korean veteran Lee Hyun-il in the semifinals to set up yet another meeting with his chief rival Lee Chong Wei. Unlike the 2008 Olympic final this one was no cakewalk for Lin. He lost the first game to Lee but came back strongly to take the second. The rubber game was a thriller which saw Lin claw back from slight deficits most of the way to finally prevail 21-19  An ecstatic Lin thus became the first men's singles player to retain the Olympic title, while Lee, now almost 30, was once again foiled at one of the sport's two biggest events (aside from the Thomas and Uber Cups), the Olympics and the World Championships.

2013
After his 2012 Olympic victory Lin did not make another tournament appearance until the 2013 Badminton Asia Championships, in April where, citing injury, he withdrew from the quarterfinals. Amid some speculation that he was planning to retire, Lin was granted a special wild card entry into the World Championships in Guangzhou, as, despite his great achievements, his recent inactivity had caused his world ranking to fall below that of other Chinese players who would then normally fill the maximum quota of three entrants that any one country was allowed. Without appearing in any tournament between the Badminton Asia Champiohships in April and the World Championships in August, Lin was able to convert this wildcard entry into his fifth world title. He won all of his matches in straight games until the final where, yet again, hard-luck Lee Chong Wei could not quite catch him in the third game rubber, and was forced to submit with a painful cramp down 17-20.

2014
After seven month tournament absence, Lin, down to 104th in the official world rankings, returned in April and took titles in the China Masters and the Badminton Asia Championships in quick succession. Lin was part of China's Thomas Cup team which defended its title in May, but because of his deflated ranking could only play at third singles. Consequently, when China met a talented and highly motivated Japanese team in the semifinals at New Delhi, Lin could only watch helplessly as Japan took the first two singles and a doubles to break China's ten year streak of men's world team titles. Beyond this disappointment, the BWF would not grant Lin a wild card entry into the 2014 World Championships, as they did in 2013. Thus Lin could not defend his title which was won by Chinese teammate Chen Long who defeated the unlucky Lee Chong Wei in a close two game final.

In June, Lin lost in the quarterfinals of Japan Open. Shortly afterwards, he won the Australian Open, his first Super Series title since the 2012 All England Open. In November, Lin lost in the final of the China Open  to Kidambi Srikanth from India.

2015
In April, Lin won the men's singles title at the Badminton Asia Championships in China, defending his title won the previous year in South Korea. He defeated compatriot Tian Houwei 21–19, 21–8 in a match that lasted 50 minutes in the central city of Wuhan. In May, Lin Dan contributed to China winning its 10th Sudirman Cup by defeating Japan's Takuma Ueda 21–15, 21–13 in the final for his team's third and decisive point. His return to the World Championships in August, however, was not particularly auspicious as he was routinely eliminated by Denmark's Jan O. Jorgensen in the quarterfinals, as Lin's compatriot Chen Long again prevailed over Lee Chong Wei in the finals. Recovering from this disappointment, in September Lin won his only Super Series title of the year at the Japan Open, making a remarkable comeback after trailing 3–11 in the deciding game of the final against Denmark's young star Viktor Axelsen.

2016
In March, Lin defeated Taiwan's Chou Tien-Chen in three hard games to clinch his seventh men's singles title at the German Open. A week after this win, Lin regained his All England title in Birmingham England, giving him his 6th victory at this prestigious event. In impressive form, he beat compatriot Tian Houwei 21–9, 21–10 in the final.

In April, Lin Dan beat world No. 1 Chen Long in straight games to lift his sixth China Masters crown in Jiangsu, China. Here Lin showed his competitive mettle by coming from 11-16 behind in the second game to clinch the match 23-21. In June, however, he was stunned in second round of Indonesia Open by eighteen year old Jonatan Christie.

At the 2016 Rio Summer Olympics, Lin sailed through his group round robin to qualify for the main draw. In the quarterfinals he was tested by India's Srikanth Kidambi, but pulled through 21-18 in the third game. This set up a semifinal confrontation with long-time rival Lee Chong Wei which drew great fan interest as the players, both in their thirties, were assumed to be near retirement. In another epic match Lee was finally able to reverse past Olympic and World Championship losses to Lin and prevail, 15–21, 21–11, 22–20. But Lee's quest for Olympic gold after two silver medals ended with a disappointing finale, as he was beaten in two close games by Lin's compatriot Chen Long. In the bronze medal match, Lin played Denmark's Viktor Axelsen. After taking the first set 21–15, the two-time Olympic champion lost the next two and the match with a scoreline of 21–15, 10–21, 17–21. After the Rio Olympics, he skipped all international tournaments for the remainder of the year.

2017
In March, at the prestigious All England Championships Lin defeated Viktor Axelson in the quarterfinals but was eliminated in the semifinals by his countryman Shi Yuqi, more than twelve years Lin's Junior. However, he bounced back to win the Swiss Open by beating Shi Yuqi in the finals. In April he won the Malaysia Open for the first time by defeating Lee Chong Wei, who had virtually owned this title for more than a decade. In the China Masters he lost in the semifinal to Qiao Bin, and in the Badminton Asia Championship, where he recorded a semifinal win over Lee Chong Wei, he took a silver medal after losing to Chen Long in the final. Lin was beaten in the German Open and Indonesian Open respectively in round of 16. He lost to Chen Long in the Australian Open quarter finals.

At the World Championships in Glasgow, Scotland, at age 33, Lin managed to reach a record seventh men's singles final by beating Hong Kong's Wong Wing Ki, 21–17, 21–18 in the quarter finals and beating Korea's Son Wan-ho, 21–17, 21–14 in the semi finals. But in the finals, he was beaten in straight sets by his ten years younger opponent, Viktor Axelsen of Denmark, 22–20, 21–16.

2018
In March, the 34-year-old Lin tied Rudy Hartono's record of reaching ten All England  men's singles finals, but was foiled in his try for a seventh title by his much younger compatriot, Shi Yuqi in three exhausting games, 19-21, 21-16, 9-21. In May, he won the New Zealand Open by beating talented Indonesian youngster Jonatan Christie in two close games, 21-14, 21-19. Later that month, Lin was a member of the Chinese team which regained the Thomas Cup after four years of absence, though his team was never extended to a deciding 5th match which would have required his services in the third singles position.

2019
In his first tournament of 2019, Lin reached the final of the Thailand Masters, where he lost to the up and coming Loh Kean Yew in two tightly contested games, 19-21, 18-21. In April, at the age of 35, he won his second Malaysia Open title, beating higher ranked compatriot Shi Yuqi, 21-19, 16-21, 21-12 and Chen Long, 9-21, 21-17, 21-11 in the semifinals and finals respectively. However, he withdrew from the Singapore Open during the first round against Viktor Axelsen, citing a "thigh injury", but only after being visibly upset by early line calls. In May, he lost in the semifinals of the New Zealand Open to Ng Ka Long in two straight games, 13-21, 11-21. In November, he lost in the finals of the Korea Masters tournament to Kanta Tsuneyama in two straight games as well, 22-24, 12-21.

2020
Lin begins the 2020 season poorly. In January, he was eliminated in the first round of the Malaysia Masters by Jan Ø. Jørgensen in two tense games, 19-21, 18-21. The following week, he participated in the Indonesia Masters and was defeated in the first round again, this time by Viktor Axelsen, who beat him in two relatively easy games, 12-21, 14-21. Lin then followed up with yet another first round exit at the Thailand Masters where he lost to Ng Ka Long in another two straight games defeat, 18-21, 9-21. At the All England Open held in March, he reached the second round but was defeated by compatriot Chen Long, 17-21, 8-21. This will turn out to be his last tournament as the rest were canceled due to the COVID-19 outbreak.

Retirement 
On 4 July 2020 Lin Dan announced his retirement, saying "at 37, pain and injuries no longer allow me to fight with my teammates. I have gratitude, a heavy heart and unwillingness." After his retirement, he joined Instagram to stay connected with his fans all over the world.

Rivalry with Lee Chong Wei

The Lee–Lin rivalry was a rivalry between two professional badminton players, Lee Chong Wei and Lin Dan whose careers were almost exactly contemporaneous. The rivalry is often considered the greatest in the history of badminton even though Lin had the decided edge. Of their 40 meetings, Lin won the head-to-head by 28–12.

Personal life 
Lin has been in a relationship with Xie Xingfang, herself a former world champion, since 2003. They were quietly engaged on 13 December 2010 in Haizhu, Guangzhou. Xie initially denied but later acknowledged romantic involvement with Lin, who reacted angrily at the public exposure of their relationship, citing reasons of personal privacy. The two were married on 23 September 2012 and the wedding ceremony was held at the Beijing University of Technology.

Lin had five tattoos visible during the 2012 Summer Olympics. His upper left arm has a Christian cross, his lower left arm has five stars, his right upper arm reads "until the end of world", a double "F" lettering on his lower right arm, and his initials "LD" are tattooed on the back of his neck. These tattoos have been the subject of controversy due to his military and religious status.

On 17 October 2012, he became the first active Chinese badminton player to accept a master's degree, which was presented at Huaqiao University. His autobiography, Until the End of the World, was published after he successfully defended his Olympic title at the London 2012 Olympics.

He and his wife Xie Xingfang had their first child "Xiao Yu" (Little feather) on 5 November 2016. On November 17, 2016, he admitted to an affair and apologised on Weibo. Social media users had purportedly identified the woman as actress and model Zhao Yaqi.

Awards 
Lin won the Eddie Choong Player of the Year award for two consecutive years in 2006 and 2007. He also secured the BWF Best Male Player of the Year in 2008. Lin was voted Most Valuable Player (MVP) during the 2010 Asian Games in Guangzhou, China. On 16 January 2011, he was named China's best male athlete for 2010 in China Central Television's Sports Personality of the Year poll for his clean sweep in major badminton titles.

Social media 
Weibo is the main social media platform which Lin is using to post and update his latest status as well as communicate with his fans or friends. Lin uses his name '林丹‘as the name of the account. In February 2018, the latest number of his followers on Weibo has achieved 3.7 million. Additionally, Lin's fan group has set an exclusive account called '林丹全国球迷会‘ on Weibo to update Lin's latest status, post his pictures and results of matches.

Achievements

Olympic Games

World Championships

World Cup

Asian Games

Asian Championships

East Asian Games

World Junior Championships

Asian Junior Championships

BWF World Tour (2 titles, 3 runners-up) 
The BWF World Tour, which was announced on 19 March 2017 and implemented in 2018, is a series of elite badminton tournaments sanctioned by the Badminton World Federation (BWF). The BWF World Tours are divided into levels of World Tour Finals, Super 1000, Super 750, Super 500, Super 300 (part of the HSBC World Tour), and the BWF Tour Super 100.

BWF Superseries (21 titles, 10 runners-up) 
The BWF Superseries, launched on 14 December 2006 and implemented in 2007, is a series of elite badminton tournaments, sanctioned by Badminton World Federation (BWF). BWF Superseries has two levels: Superseries and Superseries Premier. A season of Superseries features twelve tournaments around the world, which introduced since 2011, with successful players invited to the Superseries Finals held at the year end.

  BWF Superseries Finals tournament
  BWF Superseries Premier tournament
  BWF Superseries tournament

IBF/BWF Grand Prix (28 titles, 6 runners-up) 
The BWF Grand Prix had two levels, the BWF Grand Prix and Grand Prix Gold. It was a series of badminton tournaments sanctioned by the Badminton World Federation (BWF) which was held from 2007 to 2017. The World Badminton Grand Prix sanctioned by International Badminton Federation (IBF) from 1983 to 2006.

 BWF Grand Prix Gold tournament
 BWF & IBF Grand Prix tournament

Invitational tournament

Performance timeline 

To avoid confusion and double counting, these charts are updated at the conclusion of a tournament or when the player's participation has ended.

Singles 
This table is current through 2020 All England Open.

* : Means Lin Dan gave a walkover at his last round of this tournament (Lost the match and didn't count into the number of loss)

Notes
 BWF Super Series Finals was held from 2008 to 2017, when BWF World Tour Finals replaced it.

Longest winning streak

34 match winning streak (2006)http://www.sport.gov.mo/uploads/wizdownload/201101/5833_u6luw.pdf

Record against selected opponents 
Record against Year-end Finals finalists, World Championships semi-finalists, and Olympic quarter-finalists.

Records

References

External links

 
 
 
 

1983 births
Living people
People from Longyan
Hakka sportspeople
Badminton players from Fujian
Chinese male badminton players
World No. 1 badminton players
Olympic badminton players of China
Olympic gold medalists for China
Olympic medalists in badminton
Badminton players at the 2004 Summer Olympics
Badminton players at the 2008 Summer Olympics
Badminton players at the 2012 Summer Olympics
Badminton players at the 2016 Summer Olympics
Medalists at the 2012 Summer Olympics
Medalists at the 2008 Summer Olympics
Badminton players at the 2002 Asian Games
Badminton players at the 2006 Asian Games
Badminton players at the 2010 Asian Games
Badminton players at the 2014 Asian Games
Badminton players at the 2018 Asian Games
Asian Games gold medalists for China
Asian Games silver medalists for China
Asian Games bronze medalists for China
Asian Games medalists in badminton
Medalists at the 2002 Asian Games
Medalists at the 2006 Asian Games
Medalists at the 2010 Asian Games
Medalists at the 2014 Asian Games
Medalists at the 2018 Asian Games
21st-century Chinese people